St Thomas College, established in 1975, is a senior secondary school/intermediate college located in the Sarojini Nagar locality of southern Lucknow, the capital city of India's state of Uttar Pradesh.

It is affiliated to the Council for the Indian School Certificate Examinations (CISCE) for Class 10 (ICSE) and Class 12 (ISC) exams, and imparts  education from toddlers in the Pre-Nursery (about 3 years of age) to young adults in Class 12 (about 17 years of age).

The school's motto is "To Love is to Serve".

The school did not start off as a Senior Secondary school right from its inception. As the school evolved, it was known as: St Thomas School, St Thomas High School, St Thomas Inter College' and now known as " St.Thomas College ".

The school is a member of the Catholic Diocese of Lucknow, India.

Notable alumni
 Nitya Prakash, Novelist

References

Catholic schools in India
Primary schools in Uttar Pradesh
High schools and secondary schools in Uttar Pradesh
Intermediate colleges in Uttar Pradesh
Christian schools in Uttar Pradesh
Private schools in Lucknow
Educational institutions established in 1975
1975 establishments in Uttar Pradesh